Kamchiya Glacier is located on Livingston Island in the South Shetland Islands, Antarctica situated south of the glacial divide between the Drake Passage and Bransfield Strait, and south of Tundzha Glacier, west-southwest of Pimpirev Glacier and east of Verila Glacier.  The glacier extends 5 km along an east–west axis and is 2.2 km wide, draining into South Bay between Ereby Point and Memorable Beach.

The feature is named after the Kamchiya River in northeastern Bulgaria.

Location
Bulgarian mapping in 2005, 2009 and 2017.

See also
 List of glaciers in the Antarctic
 Glaciology

Maps
 L.L. Ivanov et al. Antarctica: Livingston Island and Greenwich Island, South Shetland Islands. Scale 1:100000 topographic map. Sofia: Antarctic Place-names Commission of Bulgaria, 2005.
 L.L. Ivanov. Antarctica: Livingston Island and Greenwich, Robert, Snow and Smith Islands. Scale 1:120000 topographic map.  Troyan: Manfred Wörner Foundation, 2009.
 L.L. Ivanov. Antarctica: Livingston Island and Smith Island. Scale 1:100000 topographic map. Manfred Wörner Foundation, 2017.

References
 Kamchiya Glacier. SCAR Composite Antarctic Gazetteer
 Bulgarian Antarctic Gazetteer. Antarctic Place-names Commission. (details in Bulgarian, basic data in English)

External links
 Kamchiya Glacier. Copernix satellite image

Glaciers of Livingston Island